Many episodes of the American HBO comedy television series Curb Your Enthusiasm feature guest stars. While a lot of these guest appearances are for fictional roles, a large number of the guest stars on the show are celebrities playing themselves (or fictionalized versions thereof), including actors, comedians and sportspeople.

Curb Your Enthusiasm stars Larry David (co-creator of Seinfeld) as himself, with Cheryl Hines as his wife Cheryl, and Jeff Garlin as his best friend and manager Jeff. A number of the guest stars have recurring roles on the show, with some appearing especially frequently, such as Richard Lewis (himself), and Susie Essman (Susie Greene).

This list contains all guest appearances on Curb that received a "Guest Star" or "Special Guest Star" billing in the closing credits of at least one episode. Sometimes an actor might not be credited as guest star on his or her first appearance, but will be in subsequent episodes. For example, Susie Essman appears as Susie in several episodes of the first season, but only got nominated to guest star role in the second season. The list may also contain certain notable non-guest star appearances, if the person plays him- or herself; such as Dr. Phil McGraw's role in the episode "Vehicular Fellatio", in which he played himself but did not receive guest star billing.

Season 1 (2000)
In the first season, the characters of the show are introduced across a series of mostly isolated episodes, including recurring characters, such as Richard Lewis and Ted Danson. Jeff's wife Susie (Susie Essman) also appears in some of the episodes – however, she has only received guest star credit from season 2 onwards. Julia Louis-Dreyfus (who played Elaine in Seinfeld) also makes an appearance, along with her husband.

As themselves

In fictional roles

Season 2 (2001)
In season two, Cheryl is tired of Larry not working, so he begins to develop a new television show, first with guest stars Jason Alexander and Julia Louis-Dreyfus (George and Elaine on Seinfeld, respectively) as themselves. However, Larry's constant social faux pas ruin all of their chances with every major television network. This season also begins a long running tradition of Wanda Sykes appearing to chastise Larry whenever he does something seemingly (but not actually) racist. Other notable guest stars playing themselves include Rob Reiner, and professional basketball player Shaquille "Shaq" O'Neal in the episode "Shaq".

As themselves

In fictional roles

Season 3 (2002)
In season three, Larry, along with Ted Danson and Michael York, invests in a restaurant enterprise which finally opens despite many mishaps, most of which are Larry's fault. Director Martin Scorsese appears in a short story arc, in which Larry is given a film role. The episode "The Terrorist Attack" features singer-songwriter Alanis Morissette, as well as actors Paul Reiser and Martin Short.

As themselves

As themselves, not credited as guest star

In fictional roles

Season 4 (2004)
In season four, Mel Brooks casts Larry as the lead in his hit musical The Producers. Many episodes revolve around preparing for the opening night of the show, with the hour-long season finale taking place at the musical's premiere. Larry is first cast alongside Ben Stiller, who is later replaced by David Schwimmer. Both Stiller's wife, Christine Taylor, and Mel Brook's wife, Anne Bancroft guest star during the season, the latter in one of her latest appearances before her death. 
Professional basketball player Muggsy Bogues appears in the episode "The Surrogate". Several cast and crew members of the real life Producers production also appear, including the musical's orchestra and ensemble.

As themselves

As themselves, not credited as guest star

In fictional roles

Season 5 (2005)
In season five, Larry's friend Richard Lewis gets very ill and requires a kidney transplant. Larry is a match, but he spends the season looking for other sources of a kidney for Lewis. Also in season five, Larry suspects he may be adopted and embarks on a search to find his biological parents. Celebrities playing themselves this season include Kevin Nealon and George Lopez, as well as professional golfer Gary Player. The episode "The Smoking Jacket" is partly set in the Playboy Mansion, and Playboy founder Hugh Hefner appears. A special segment in the season finale features Dustin Hoffman and Sacha Baron Cohen as Larry's "guides".

As themselves

As themselves, not credited as guest star

In fictional roles

Season 6 (2007)
Season six is built around Cheryl persuading Larry to take in a black family that is left homeless after a major Gulf Coast hurricane. Special guest stars playing themselves include Senator Barbara Boxer, Lucy Lawless (who played the title character in Xena: Warrior Princess), Ben Stiller, and professional tennis player John McEnroe. The season introduces Vivica A. Fox as Loretta, and J. B. Smoove as Leon.

As themselves

In fictional roles

Season 7 (2009)
Most of season seven is centered on creating a Seinfeld reunion show with the original cast, while Larry is trying to get back with Cheryl. All four stars of Seinfeld – Jerry Seinfeld, Julia Louis-Dreyfus, Jason Alexander and Michael Richards – appear as special guest stars in a number of episodes, including the season finale, in which an all-new Seinfeld segment is shown. Actors who played recurring roles on Seinfeld also appear in the episode "The Table Read". Celebrities who portrayed themselves include Meg Ryan, David Spade, Christian Slater, and Rosie O'Donnell.

As themselves

* "Special Guest Star" credit.

As themselves, not credited as guest star

In fictional roles

Season 8 (2011)
Season 8 continues to follow Larry's single life. At the midpoint of the season, the main characters all move to New York City, where the rest of the season is set. The season's premiere episode is the last one that features Cheryl Hines (Cheryl David), and subsequent episodes do not credit her as part of the main cast. Starting with this season however, Susie Essman (Susie Green) has been promoted to the main cast of the show. Prominent celebrities that played themselves in this season include Ricky Gervais, Rosie O'Donnell, and Michael J. Fox. Ana Gasteyer played Larry's date Jennifer in two episodes.

As themselves

As themselves, not credited as guest star

In fictional roles

Season 9 (2017)

As themselves

In fictional roles

Season 10 (2020)

As themselves

In fictional roles

Season 11 (2021)

As themselves

In fictional roles

See also
 Curb Your Enthusiasm
 List of Curb Your Enthusiasm recurring roles
 List of Curb Your Enthusiasm episodes

References

 Seasons 1–4 (except episode 34, "The Weatherman"), 6–8: Closing credits of episodes
 Season 5 and episode 34, "The Weatherman": 

Curb Your Enthusiasm guest stars